The concept of self-replicating spacecraft,  as envisioned by mathematician John von Neumann, has been described by futurists including physicist Michio Kaku and discussed across a wide breadth of hard science fiction novels and stories.  Self-replicating probes are sometimes referred to as von Neumann probes.    Self-replicating spacecraft would in some ways either mimic or echo the features of living organisms or viruses.

Theory 
Von Neumann proved that the most effective way of performing large-scale mining operations such as mining an entire moon or asteroid belt would be by self-replicating spacecraft, taking advantage of their exponential growth. In theory, a self-replicating spacecraft could be sent to a neighbouring planetary system, where it would seek out raw materials (extracted from asteroids, moons, gas giants, etc.) to create replicas of itself. These replicas would then be sent out to other planetary systems. The original "parent" probe could then pursue its primary purpose within the star system. This mission varies widely depending on the variant of self-replicating starship proposed.

Given this pattern, and its similarity to the reproduction patterns of bacteria, it has been pointed out that von Neumann machines might be considered a form of life. In his short story "Lungfish" (see Self-replicating machines in fiction), David Brin touches on this idea, pointing out that self-replicating machines launched by different species might actually compete with one another (in a Darwinistic fashion) for raw material, or even have conflicting missions. Given enough variety of "species" they might even form a type of ecology, or – should they also have a form of artificial intelligence – a society. They may even mutate with untold thousands of "generations".

The first quantitative engineering analysis of such a spacecraft was published in 1980 by Robert Freitas, in which the non-replicating Project Daedalus design was modified to include all subsystems necessary for self-replication. The design's strategy was to use the probe to deliver a "seed" factory with a mass of about 443 tons to a distant site, have the seed factory produce many copies of itself there to increase its total manufacturing capacity over a 500-year period, and then use the resulting automated industrial complex to construct more probes with a single seed factory on board each.

It has been theorized that a self-replicating starship utilizing relatively conventional theoretical methods of interstellar travel (i.e., no exotic faster-than-light propulsion, and speeds limited to an "average cruising speed" of 0.1c.) could spread throughout a galaxy the size of the Milky Way in as little as half a million years.

Debate on Fermi's paradox 
In 1981, Frank Tipler put forth an argument that extraterrestrial intelligences do not exist, based on the fact that von Neumann probes have not been observed. Given even a moderate rate of replication and the history of the galaxy, such probes should already be common throughout space and thus, we should have already encountered them. Because we have not, this shows that extraterrestrial intelligences do not exist. This is thus a resolution to the Fermi paradox – that is, the question of why we have not already encountered extraterrestrial intelligence if it is common throughout the universe.

A response came from Carl Sagan and William Newman. Now known as Sagan's Response, it pointed out that in fact Tipler had underestimated the rate of replication, and that von Neumann probes should have already started to consume most of the mass in the galaxy. Any intelligent race would therefore, Sagan and Newman reasoned, not design von Neumann probes in the first place, and would try to destroy any von Neumann probes found as soon as they were detected. As Robert Freitas has pointed out, the assumed capacity of von Neumann probes described by both sides of the debate is unlikely in reality, and more modestly reproducing systems are unlikely to be observable in their effects on our solar system or the galaxy as a whole.

Another objection to the prevalence of von Neumann probes, also known as the Great Filter, is that civilizations of the type that could potentially create such devices may have inherently short lifetimes, and self-destruct before so advanced a stage is reached, through such events as biological or nuclear warfare, nanoterrorism, resource exhaustion, ecological catastrophe, or pandemics.

Simple workarounds exist to avoid the over-replication scenario. Radio transmitters, or other means of wireless communication, could be used by probes programmed not to replicate beyond a certain density (such as five probes per cubic parsec) or arbitrary limit (such as ten million within one century), analogous to the Hayflick limit in cell reproduction.  One problem with this defence against uncontrolled replication is that it would only require a single probe to malfunction and begin unrestricted reproduction for the entire approach to fail – essentially a technological cancer – unless each probe also has the ability to detect such malfunction in its neighbours and implements a seek and destroy protocol (which in turn could lead to probe-on-probe space wars if faulty probes first managed to multiply to high numbers before they were found by sound ones, which could then well have programming to replicate to matching numbers so as to manage the infestation).  Another workaround is based on the need for spacecraft heating during long interstellar travel.  The use of plutonium as a thermal source would limit the ability to self-replicate.  The spacecraft would have no programming to make more plutonium even if it found the required raw materials.  Another is to program the spacecraft with a clear understanding of the dangers of uncontrolled replication.

Applications for self-replicating spacecraft 
The details of the mission of self-replicating starships can vary widely from proposal to proposal, and the only common trait is the self-replicating nature.

Von Neumann probes 

A von Neumann probe is a spacecraft capable of replicating itself. It is a concatenation of two concepts: a "Von Neumann universal constructor" (self-replicating machine) and a probe (an instrument to explore or examine something). The concept is named after Hungarian American mathematician and physicist John von Neumann, who rigorously studied the concept of self-replicating machines that he called "Universal Assemblers" and which are often referred to as "von Neumann machines". Such constructs could be theorised to comprise five basic components (variations of this template could create other machines such as Bracewell probes):

 Probe: which would contain the actual probing instruments & goal-directed AI to guide the construct.
 Life-support systems: mechanisms to repair and maintain the construct.
 Factory: mechanisms to harvest resources & replicate itself. 
 Memory banks: store programs for all its components & information gained by the probe.
 Engine: motor to move the probe.

Andreas Hein and science fiction author Stephen Baxter proposed different types of von Neumann probes, termed "Philosopher" and "Founder", where the purpose of the former is exploration and for the latter preparing future settlement.

A near-term concept of a self-replicating probe has been proposed by the Initiative for Interstellar Studies, achieving about 70% self-replication, based on current and near-term technologies.

If a self-replicating probe finds evidence of primitive life (or a primitive, low-level culture) it might be programmed to lie dormant, silently observe, attempt to make contact (this variant is known as a Bracewell probe), or even interfere with or guide the evolution of life in some way.

Physicist Paul Davies of Arizona State University has raised the possibility of a probe resting on our own Moon, having arrived at some point in Earth's ancient prehistory and remained to monitor Earth, which is reminiscent of Arthur C. Clarke's "The Sentinel" and the Stanley Kubrick film 2001: A Space Odyssey that was based on Clarke's story.

A variant idea on the interstellar von Neumann probe idea is that of the "Astrochicken", proposed by Freeman Dyson. While it has the common traits of self-replication, exploration, and communication with its "home base", Dyson conceived the Astrochicken to explore and operate within our own planetary system, and not explore interstellar space.

Anders Sandberg and Stuart Armstrong argued that launching the colonization of the entire reachable universe through self-replicating probes is well within the capabilities of a star-spanning civilization, and proposed a theoretical approach for achieving it in 32 years, by mining planet Mercury for resources and constructing a Dyson Swarm around the Sun.

Berserkers 

A variant of the self-replicating starship is the Berserker. Unlike the benign probe concept, Berserkers are programmed to seek out and exterminate lifeforms and life-bearing exoplanets whenever they are encountered.

The name is derived from the Berserker series of novels by Fred Saberhagen which describes a war between humanity and such machines. Saberhagen points out (through one of his characters) that the Berserker warships in his novels are not von Neumann machines themselves, but the larger complex of Berserker machines – including automated shipyards – do constitute a von Neumann machine. This again brings up the concept of an ecology of von Neumann machines, or even a von Neumann hive entity.

It is speculated in fiction that Berserkers could be created and launched by a xenophobic civilization (see Anvil of Stars, by Greg Bear, in the section In fiction below) or could theoretically "mutate" from a more benign probe. For instance, a von Neumann ship designed for terraforming processes – mining a planet's surface and adjusting its atmosphere to more human-friendly conditions – could be interpreted as attacking previously-inhabited planets, killing their inhabitants in the process of changing the planetary environment, and then self-replicating to dispatch more ships to 'attack' other planets.

Replicating seeder ships 
Yet another variant on the idea of the self-replicating starship is that of the seeder ship. Such starships might store the genetic patterns of lifeforms from their home world, perhaps even of the species which created it. Upon finding a habitable exoplanet, or even one that might be terraformed, it would try to replicate such lifeforms – either from stored embryos or from stored information using molecular nanotechnology to build zygotes with varying genetic information from local raw materials.

Such ships might be terraforming vessels, preparing colony worlds for later colonization by other vessels, or – should they be programmed to recreate, raise, and educate individuals of the species that created it – self-replicating colonizers themselves. Seeder ships would be a suitable alternative to generation ships as a way to colonize worlds too distant to travel to in one lifetime.

In fiction

Von Neumann probes 

 2001: A Space Odyssey: The monoliths in Arthur C. Clarke's book and Stanley Kubrick's film 2001: A Space Odyssey were intended to be self-replicating probes, though the artifacts in "The Sentinel", Clarke's original short story upon which 2001 was based, were not.  The film was to begin with a series of scientists explaining how probes like these would be the most efficient method of exploring outer space. Kubrick cut the opening segment from his film at the last minute, however, and these monoliths became almost mystical entities in both the film and Clarke's novel.
 Cold As Ice: In the novel by Charles Sheffield, there is a segment where the author (a physicist) describes Von Neumann machines harvesting sulfur, nitrogen, phosphorus, helium-4, and various metals from the atmosphere of Jupiter.
 Destiny's Road: Larry Niven frequently refers to Von Neumann probes in many of his works. In his 1998 book Destiny's Road, Von Neumann machines are scattered throughout the human colony world Destiny and its moon Quicksilver in order to build and maintain technology and to make up for the lack of the resident humans' technical knowledge; the Von Neumann machines primarily construct a stretchable fabric cloth capable of acting as a solar collector which serves as the humans' primary energy source. The Von Neumann machines also engage in ecological maintenance and other exploratory work.
 The Devil's Blind Spot: See also Alexander Kluge, The Devil's Blind Spot (New Directions; 2004.)
 Grey Goo: In the video game Grey Goo, the "Goo" faction is composed entirely of Von Neumann probes sent through various microscopic wormholes to map the Milky Way Galaxy. The faction's units are configurations of nanites used during their original mission of exploration, which have adapted to a combat role. The Goo starts as an antagonist to the Human and Beta factions, but their true objective is revealed during their portion of the single-player campaign. Related to, and inspired by, the Grey Goo doomsday scenario.
 Spin: In the novel by Robert Charles Wilson, Earth is veiled by a temporal field. Humanity tries to understand and escape this field by using Von Neumann probes. It is later revealed that the field itself was generated by Von Neumann probes from another civilization, and that a competition for resources had taken place between earth's and the aliens' probes.
 The Third Millennium: A History of the World AD 2000–3000: In the book by Brian Stableford and David Langford (published by Alfred A. Knopf, Inc., 1985) humanity sends cycle-limited Von Neumann probes out to the nearest stars to do open-ended exploration and to announce humanity's existence to whoever might encounter them.
 Von Neumann's War: In Von Neumann's War by John Ringo and Travis S. Taylor (published by Baen Books in 2007) Von Neumann probes arrive in the solar system, moving in from the outer planets, and converting all metals into gigantic structures. Eventually, they arrive on Earth, wiping out much of the population before being beaten back when humanity reverse engineers some of the probes.
 We Are Legion (We Are Bob) by Dennis E. Taylor: Bob Johansson, the former owner of a software company, dies in a car accident, only to wake up a hundred years later as a computer emulation of Bob. Given a Von Neumann probe by America's religious government, he is sent out to explore, exploit, expand, and experiment for the good of the human race.
 ARMA 3: In the "First Contact" single-player campaign introduced in the Contact expansion, a series of extraterrestrial network structures are found in various locations on Earth, one being the fictional country of Livonia, the campaign's setting. In the credits of the campaign, a radio broadcast reveals that a popular theory surrounding the networks is that they are a type of Von Neumann probe that arrived on Earth during the time of a supercontinent.
 Questionable Content: In Jeph Jacques' webcomic, Faye Whitaker refers to the "Floating Black Slab Emitting A Low Hum" as a possible Von Neumann probe in Episode 4645: Accessorized.
 In the third act of the incremental game Universal Paperclips, after all of Earth's matter has been converted into paperclips, players are tasked with sending Von Neumann probes into the universe to find and consume all matter in service of making paperclips, eventually entering a war with another class of probes called "drifters" that are created as a result of random mutations.

Berserkers 

 In the science fiction short story collection Berserker by Fred Saberhagen, a series of short stories include accounts of battles fought against extremely destructive Berserker machines. This and subsequent books set in the same fictional universe are the origin of the term "Berserker probe".
 In the 2003 miniseries reboot of Battlestar Galactica (and the subsequent 2004 series) the Cylons are similar to Berserkers in their wish to destroy human life. They were created by humans in a group of fictional planets called the Twelve Colonies. The Cylons created special models that look like humans in order to destroy the twelve colonies and later, the fleeing fleet of surviving humans.
 The Borg of Star Trek – a self-replicating bio-mechanical race that is dedicated to the task of achieving perfection through the assimilation of useful technology and lifeforms. Their ships are massive mechanical cubes (a close step from the Berserker's massive mechanical Spheres).
 Science fiction author Larry Niven later borrowed this notion in his short story "A Teardrop Falls".
 In the computer game Star Control II, the Slylandro Probe is an out-of-control self-replicating probe that attacks starships of other races. They were not originally intended to be a berserker probe; they sought out intelligent life for peaceful contact, but due to a programming error, they would immediately switch to "resource extraction" mode and attempt to dismantle the target ship for raw materials. While the plot claims that the probes reproduce "at a geometric rate", the game itself caps the frequency of encountering these probes. It is possible to deal with the menace in a side-quest, but this is not necessary to complete the game, as the probes only appear one at a time, and the player's ship will eventually be fast and powerful enough to outrun them or destroy them for resources – although the probes will eventually dominate the entire game universe.
 In Iain Banks' novel Excession, hegemonising swarms are described as a form of Outside Context Problem. An example of an "Aggressive Hegemonising Swarm Object" is given as an uncontrolled self-replicating probe with the goal of turning all matter into copies of itself.  After causing great damage, they are somehow transformed using unspecified techniques by the Zetetic Elench and become "Evangelical Hegemonising Swarm Objects". Such swarms (referred to as "smatter") reappear in the later novels Surface Detail (which features scenes of space combat against the swarms) and The Hydrogen Sonata.
 The Inhibitors from Alastair Reynolds' Revelation Space series are self-replicating machines whose purpose is to inhibit the development of intelligent star-faring cultures.  They are dormant for extreme periods of time until they detect the presence of a space-faring culture and proceed to exterminate it even to the point of sterilizing entire planets.  They are very difficult to destroy as they seem to have faced every type of weapon ever devised and only need a short time to 'remember' the necessary counter-measures.
 Also from Alastair Reynolds' books, the "Greenfly" terraforming machines are another form of berserker machines. For unknown reasons, but probably an error in their programming, they destroy planets and turn them into trillions of domes filled with vegetation – after all, their purpose is to produce a habitable environment for humans, however in doing so they inadvertently decimate the human race. By 10,000, they have wiped out most of the Galaxy.
 The Reapers in the video game series Mass Effect are also self-replicating probes bent on destroying any advanced civilization encountered in the galaxy. They lie dormant in the vast spaces between the galaxies and follow a cycle of extermination. It is seen in Mass Effect 2 that they assimilate any advanced species.
 Mantrid Drones from the science fiction television series Lexx were an extremely aggressive type of self-replicating Berserker machine, eventually converting the majority of the matter in the universe into copies of themselves in the course of their quest to thoroughly exterminate humanity.
 The Babylon 5 episode "Infection" showed a smaller scale berserker in the form of the Icarran War Machine. After being created with the goal of defeating an unspecified enemy faction, the War Machines proceeded to exterminate all life on the planet Icarra VII because they had been programmed with standards for what constituted a 'Pure Icaran' based on religious teachings, which no actual Icaran could satisfy. Because the Icaran were pre-starflight, the War Machines became dormant after completing their task rather than spreading. One unit was reactivated on-board Babylon 5 after being smuggled past quarantine by an unscrupulous archaeologist, but after being confronted with how they had rendered Icara VII a dead world, the simulated personality of the War Machine committed suicide. 
 The Babylon 5 episode "A Day in the Strife" features a probe that threatens the station with destruction unless a series of questions designed to test a civilization's level of advancement are answered correctly. The commander of the station correctly surmises that the probe is actually a berserker and that if the questions are answered the probe would identify them as a threat to its originating civilization and detonate.
 Greg Bear's novel The Forge of God deals directly with the concept of "Berserker" von Neumann probes and their consequences.  The idea is further explored in the novel's sequel, Anvil of Stars, which explores the reaction other civilizations have to the creation and release of Berserkers.
 In Gregory Benford's Galactic Center Saga series, an antagonist berserker machine race is encountered by Earth, first as a probe in In the Ocean of Night, and then in an attack in Across the Sea of Suns.  The berserker machines do not seek to completely eradicate a race if merely throwing it into a primitive low technological state will do as they did to the EMs encountered in Across the Sea of Suns.  The alien machine Watchers would not be considered von Neumann machines themselves, but the collective machine race could.
 On Stargate SG-1 the Replicators were a vicious race of insect-like robots that were originally created by an android named Reese to serve as toys. They grew beyond her control and began evolving, eventually spreading throughout at least two galaxies. In addition to ordinary autonomous evolution they were able to analyze and incorporate new technologies they encountered into themselves, ultimately making them one of the most advanced "races" known. 
 On Stargate Atlantis, a second race of replicators created by the Ancients were encountered in the Pegasus Galaxy. They were created as a means to defeat the Wraith. The Ancients attempted to destroy them after they began showing signs of sentience and requested that their drive to kill the wraith be removed. This failed, and an unspecified length of time after the Ancients retreated to the Milky Way Galaxy, the replicators nearly succeeded in destroying the Wraith. The Wraith were able to hack into the replicators and deactivate the extermination drive, at which point they retreated to their home world and were not heard from again until encountered by the Atlantis Expedition. After the Atlantis Expedition reactivated this dormant directive, the replicators embarked on a plan to kill the Wraith by removing their food source, i.e. all humans in the Pegasus Galaxy.
 In Stargate Universe Season 2, a galaxy billions of light years distant from the Milky Way is infested with drone ships that are programmed to annihilate intelligent life and advanced technology. The drone ships attack other space ships (including Destiny) as well as humans on planetary surfaces, but don't bother destroying primitive technology such as buildings unless they are harboring intelligent life or advanced technology.
 In the Justice League Unlimited episode "Dark Heart", an alien weapon based on this same idea lands on Earth.
 In the Homeworld: Cataclysm video game, a bio-mechanical virus called Beast has the ability to alter organic and mechanic material to suit its needs, and the ships infected become self-replicating hubs for the virus.
 In the SF MMO EVE Online, experiments to create more autonomous drones than the ones used by player's ships accidentally created 'rogue drones' which form hives in certain parts of space and are used extensively in missions as difficult opponents.
 In the computer game Sword of the Stars, the player may randomly encounter "Von Neumann". A Von Neumann mothership appears along with smaller Von Neumann probes, which attack and consume the player's ships.  The probes then return to the mothership, returning the consumed material.  If probes are destroyed, the mothership will create new ones.  If all the player's ships are destroyed, the Von Neumann probes will reduce the planets resource levels before leaving.  The probes appear as blue octahedrons, with small spheres attached to the apical points.  The mothership is a larger version of the probes. In the 2008 expansion A Murder of Crows, Kerberos Productions also introduces the VN Berserker, a combat oriented ship, which attacks player planets and ships in retaliation to violence against VN Motherships. If the player destroys the Berserker things will escalate and a System Destroyer will attack.
 In the X Computer Game Series, the Xenon are a malevolent race of artificially intelligent machines descended from terraforming ships sent out by humans to prepare worlds for eventual colonization; the result caused by a bugged software update.  They are continual antagonists in the X-Universe.
 In the comic Transmetropolitan a character mentions "Von Neumann rectal infestations" which are apparently caused by "Shit-ticks that build more shit-ticks that build more shit-ticks".
 In the anime Vandread, harvester ships attack vessels from both male- and female-dominated factions and harvest hull, reactors, and computer components to make more of themselves. To this end, Harvester ships are built around mobile factories. Earth-born humans also view the inhabitants of the various colonies to be little more than spare parts.
 In Earth 2160, the Morphidian Aliens rely on  strain aliens for colonization. Most -derived aliens can absorb water, then reproduce like a colony of cells. In this manner, even one  Lady (or Princess, or Queen) can create enough clones to cover the map. Once they have significant numbers, they "choose an evolutionary path" and swarm the enemy, taking over their resources.
 In the European comic series Storm, numbers 20 & 21, a kind of berserk von Neumann probe is set on a collision course with the Pandarve system.
 In PC role-playing game Space Rangers and its sequel Space Rangers 2: Dominators, a league of 5 nations battles three different types of Berserker robots. One that focuses on invading planets, another that battles normal space and third that lives in hyperspace.
 In the Star Wolves video game series, Berserkers are a self-replicating machine menace that threatens the known universe for purposes of destruction and/or assimilation of humanity.
 The Star Wars expanded universe features the World Devastators, large ships designed and built by the Galactic Empire that tear apart planets to use its materials to build other ships or even upgrade or replicate themselves.
 The Tet in the 2013 film Oblivion is revealed to be a Berserker of sorts: a sentient machine that travels from planet to planet, exterminating the indigenous population using armies of robotic drones and cloned members of the target species. The Tet then proceeds to harvest the planet's water in order to extract hydrogen for nuclear fusion.
 In Eclipse Phase, an ETI probe is believed to have infected the TITAN computer systems with the Exsurgent virus to cause them to go berserk and wage war on humanity. This would make ETI probes a form of berserker, albeit one that uses pre-existing computer systems as its key weapons.
 In Herr aller Dinge by Andreas Eschbach, an ancient nano machine complex is discovered buried in a glacier off the coast of Russia. When it comes in contact with materials it needs to fulfill its mission, it creates a launch facility and launches a space craft. It is later revealed that the nano machines were created by a pre-historic human race with the intention of destroying other interstellar civilizations (for an unknown reason). It is proposed that the reason there is no evidence of the race is because of the nano-machines themselves and their ability to manipulate matter at an atomic level. It is even suggested that viruses could be ancient nano machines that have evolved over time.

Replicating seeder ships 

 Code of the Lifemaker by James P. Hogan describes the evolution of a society of humanoid-like robots who inhabit Saturn's moon Titan. The sentient machines are descended from an unmanned factory ship that was to be self replicating, but suffered radiation damage and went off course, eventually landing on Titan around 1,000,000 BC.
 Manifold: Space, Stephen Baxter's novel, starts with the discovery of alien self-replicating machines active within the Solar system.
 In the Metroid Prime subseries of games, the massive Leviathans are probes routinely sent out from the planet Phaaze to infect other planets with Phazon radiation and eventually turn these planets into clones of Phaaze, where the self-replication process can continue.
 In David Brin's short story collection, The River of Time (1986), the short story "Lungfish" prominently features von Neumann probes. Not only does he explore the concept of the probes themselves, but indirectly explores the ideas of competition between different designs of probes, evolution of von Neumann probes in the face of such competition, and the development of a type of ecology between von Neumann probes. One of the vessels mentioned is clearly a Seeder type.
 In The Songs of Distant Earth by Arthur C. Clarke, humanity on a future Earth facing imminent destruction creates automated seedships that act as fire and forget lifeboats aimed at distant, habitable worlds. Upon landing, the ship begins to create new humans from stored genetic information, and an onboard computer system raises and trains the first few generations of new inhabitants. The massive ships are then broken down and used as building materials by their "children".
 On the Stargate Atlantis episode "Remnants", the Atlantis team finds an ancient probe that they later learn was launched by a now-extinct, technologically advanced race in order to seed new worlds and re-propagate their silicon-based species. The probe communicated with inhabitants of Atlantis by means of hallucinations.
 On the Stargate SG-1 episode "Scorched Earth", a species of newly relocated humanoids face extinction via an automated terraforming colony seeder ship controlled by an Artificial Intelligence.
 On Stargate Universe, the human adventurers live on a ship called Destiny. Its mission was to connect a network of Stargates, placed by preceding seeder ships on planets capable of supporting life to allow instantaneous travel between them.
 The trilogy of albums which conclude the comic book series Storm by Don Lawrence (starting with Chronicles of Pandarve 11: The Von Neumann machine) is based on self-replicating conscious machines containing the sum of all human knowledge employed to rebuild human society throughout the universe in case of disaster on Earth. The probe malfunctions and although new probes are built, they do not separate from the motherprobe, which eventually results in a cluster of malfunctioning probes so big that it can absorb entire moons.
 In the Xeno series, a rogue seeder ship (technically a berserker) known as "Deus" created humanity.

See also 

 Asteroid mining
 Astrochicken
 Bracewell probe
 Embryo space colonization
 Generation ship
 Interstellar ark
 Interstellar travel
 Self-replicating machine
 Sleeper ship
 Space colonization
 Transcension hypothesis

References 

 Boyce, Chris. Extraterrestrial Encounter: A Personal Perspective. London: David & Charles, Newton Abbot (1979).
 von Tiesenhausen, G., and Darbro, W. A. "Self-Replicating Systems," NASA Technical Memorandum 78304. Washington, D.C.: National Aeronautics and Space Administration (1980).
 Freitas Jr., Robert A. "A Self-Reproducing Interstellar Probe," Journal of the British Interplanetary Society, 33, 251–264 (1980). rfreitas.com, also molecularassembler.com
 Valdes, F., and Freitas, R. A. "Comparison of Reproducing and Non-Reproducing Starprobe Strategies for Galactic Exploration," Journal of the British Interplanetary Society, 33, 402–408 (1980). rfreitas.com

Artificial life
Fictional spacecraft by type
Hypothetical spacecraft
Self-replicating machines